Rebecca Forstadt is an American voice actress, best known for playing young female roles in various animated series. After studying theater at Orange Coast College, in Costa Mesa, California, Forstadt began her acting career by working at Knott's Berry Farm's Bird Cage Theater, performing melodramas, often as the damsel in distress character. Later, she went to Hollywood where she worked as a wardrobe mistress on such television shows as The White Shadow and Hill Street Blues, as well as for the film S.O.B.. She also spent several years doing live theater in the Los Angeles area. Most notably, she won some recognition for her portrayal of the character Josette in the world premiere of Eugène Ionesco's Tales for People Under 3 Years of Age at the Stages Theatre Center in 1982. She starred in several low-budget movies such as Mugsy's Girls, with Ruth Gordon and Laura Branigan, and Round Numbers with Kate Mulgrew, Samantha Eggar, and Shani Wallis. She also appeared as a television actress in Hill Street Blues, St. Elsewhere, and L.A. Law. Her voice acting breakthrough came when she landed the leading role of Lynn Minmei in the English version of Robotech, the popular anime series of the 1980s. Since then, she has voiced hundreds of other anime characters like Nunnally Lamperouge in Code Geass, Rika Furude in When They Cry, Monomi from Danganronpa 2 Goodbye Despair,  and Tima from Metropolis and has branched into non-anime cartoons, live-action shows (such as Masked Rider and Power Rangers: Time Force), commercials and radio work, and has performed background voices for movies such as Antz, Dr. Dolittle, and The Santa Clause.

Voice roles

Anime
 3x3 Eyes – Pai Ayanokoji (Streamline dub)
 Aesop's Fables – Additional Voices
 The Swiss Family Robinson: Flone of the Mysterious Island – Rebecca "Becca" Robinson
 Ai Tenchi Muyo! - Mihoshi
 Akira – Additional Voices (Animaze dub)
 Armitage: Dual Matrix – Yoko
 Around the World with Willy Fog – Princess Romy
 Back to the Forest – Peter
 Battle Athletes – Young Akari Kanzaki, Child, Student
 Battle Athletes Victory – Elaine Reshpigi
 Blood: The Last Vampire – Sharon
 Bottle Fairy – Tamachan
 Carried by the Wind: Tsukikage Ran – Gin, Sayo Takakagi
 Code Geass – Nunnally Lamperouge, Miya I. Hillminck
 Cowboy Bebop – Boy Witness, Muriel
 Demetan Croaker, The Boy Frog – Various
 Destiny of the Shrine Maiden – Corona
 Detatoko Princess – Annie
 Devadasy – Amala
 Digimon Tamers – Ai
 Dragon Ball: Curse of the Blood Rubies – Penny (Harmony Gold dub)
 Dragon Ball: Mystical Adventure – Chaozu/Chiaotzu (Harmony Gold dub)
 Dogtanian and the Three Muskehounds – Juliette
 Eiken – Komoe Harumachi, Kyoko Morooka
 Elves of the Forest - Patty
 Fighting Fantasy Girl Rescue Me: Mave-chan – Fern 2
 Fushigi Yūgi Eikoden – Chosei
 Gate Keepers 21 – Ayane Isuzu (as Riva West)
 Ghost in the Shell: Stand Alone Complex – Tachikoma (Batou's Tachikoma)
 Grimm's Fairy Tale Classics – Various Roles
 Hanaukyo Maid Team: La Verite – Lemon
 Hand Maid May – Cyberdoll Rena
 Higurashi: When They Cry – Rika Furude
 Honeybee Hutch – Additional Voices
 Kaze no Yojimbo – Miyuki Tanokura
 Kikaider – Girl with Cat (Ep. 4)
 Kyo Kara Maoh! – Greta
 Little Women – Amy March
 A Little Snow Fairy Sugar – Sugar
 Love Hina – Little Girl (as Reba West)
 Lucky Star – Kanata Izumi, Hikage Miyakawa
 Lupin III: Part II – Alice Henderson (Ep. 27)
 Magic Knight Rayearth – Primera
 Magical Princess Minky Momo – Momo
 Mahoromatic – Chizuko Oe (most of "Something More Beautiful", replacing Melissa Fahn from Episode 1–4, and 12–14)
 Maple Town – Patty Rabbit
 Metropolis – Tima
 Mobile Suit Gundam: The Movie Trilogy – Kika
 Noozles – Additional Voices
 Outlaw Star – Iris, Hanmyo
 Planet Busters – Child
 Please Twins! – Kaede Misumi
 Pretty Sammy – Mihoshi Mizutani, Chihiro Kawai (Eps. 2–3)
 Robotech – Lynn Minmei (as Reba West)
 Robotech II: The Sentinels – Lynn Minmei (as Reba West)
 Rozen Maiden – Suiseiseki
 Rurouni Kenshin – Marimo Ebisu
 Saint Tail – Mari, Mayu, Shoko, Saori
 Samurai Girl Real Bout High School – Miyuki Onizuka (as Reba West)
 Space Pirate Captain Harlock – Maia Devlin
 Samurai X – Kori Kamiya (Kaoru Kamiya)
 Spartakus and the Sun Beneath the Sea – Rebecca
 Tenchi Muyo! series – Mihoshi Kuramitsu (Magical Girl Pretty Sammy OVA's 2 and 3, Tenchi in Tokyo, Tenchi the Movie 2: The Daughter of Darkness, Tenchi Forever! The Movie, Tenchi Muyo! Ryo-Ohki season 3, Tenchi Muyo! GXP), Ayeka Masaki Jurai (GXP), Erma (GXP)
 Trigun – Elizabeth (Child, Ep. 6)
 Ultra Maniac – Pine
 Vampire Princess Miyu – Morishita, Yuki
 Wild Arms: Twilight Venom – Nieza
 The World of the Talisman – Little Girl
 Zatch Bell! – Rushka (Eps. 40–41)
 Wowser- Linda Lovely

Live action
 Adventures in Voice Acting – Herself
 Delta Pi – Karen
 Hallo Spencer – Peggy (voice)
 Hill Street Blues – Girl Onlooker
 L.A. Law – Waitress
 Masked Rider – Ocusect (voice)
 Mighty Morphin Power Rangers – Fighting Flea, Miss Chief (uncredited)
 Power Rangers: Time Force – Computer Voice
 Power Rangers: Wild Force – Newscaster (uncredited)
 Round Numbers – Receptionist
 St. Elsewhere – Nurse Lucy
 Weather Girl – Kiyomi Ito (voice)

Non-anime
 Hey Arnold! – Cindy/Show Spokeswoman
 The Little Polar Bear – Anna
 The Mr. Men Show – Little Miss Giggles (credited as "Reba West")
 The Return of Dogtanian – Juliette
 Willy Fog 2 – Princess Romy
 Puppy in My Pocket: Adventures in Pocketville- Eva

Video games
 .hack – Additional Voices
 Ghost in the Shell: Stand Alone Complex – Tachikoma
 The Granstream Saga – Arcia (as Reba West)
 Robotech: Battlecry – Lynn Minmei, Izzy Randal
 Danganronpa 2: Goodbye Despair - Monomi/Usami

Theme Song Performance
 Magical Princess Minky Momo
 Robotech

Production Credits

Script Adaptation
 Argento Soma
 Digimon: Digital Monsters
 Kurogane Communication
 Nightwalker: The Midnight Detective
 Samurai Girl Real Bout High School (as Rebecca Olkowski)
 Samurai X
 Wild Arms: Twilight Venom

ADR/Looping
 Antz
 Dr. Dolittle
 The Santa Clause

References

External links
 
 
 

American film actresses
American television actresses
American video game actresses
American voice actresses
Living people
20th-century American actresses
21st-century American actresses
1953 births